Regan Lauscher (born February 21, 1980 in Saskatoon, Saskatchewan) is a Canadian luger. Competing in three Winter Olympics, she earned her best finish of tenth in the women's singles event at Turin in 2006.

Her second-place finish at the Luge World competitions at Lake Placid, New York in 2004 was the best ever time by a Canadian  female luger. Lauscher's best finish at the FIL World Luge Championships was ninth in the women's singles event at Park City, Utah in 2005.

During the 2006 Winter Olympics, Lauscher wrote an online journal for the Canadian Broadcasting Corporation about her views and actions during those games. Prior to the 2006 games, she had earned her journalism degree from Mount Royal College.

Lauscher had surgeries on both of her shoulders in May 2008 and resumed training in October.

References
 2002 luge women's singles results
 2006 luge women's singles results
 After operations on both shoulders. at the Fédération Internationale de Luge de Course (24 October 2008 article accessed 24 October 2008.)

External links
 

1980 births
Canadian female lugers
Canadian people of German descent
Living people
Lugers at the 2002 Winter Olympics
Lugers at the 2006 Winter Olympics
Lugers at the 2010 Winter Olympics
Mount Royal University alumni
Olympic lugers of Canada
Sportspeople from Saskatoon